Amara fritzhiekei is a species of ground beetle in the family Carabidae, found in China, Russia, Mongolia, and North Korea.

References

Amara (genus)
Beetles of Asia
Beetles described in 2013